Buchberg is a mountain of Bavaria, Germany.

Hills of Bavaria
Mountains and hills of the Franconian Jura